Women in Seychelles enjoy the same legal, political, economic, and social rights as men.

Family life 
Seychellois society is essentially matriarchal. Mothers tend to be dominant in the household, controlling most current expenditures and looking after the interests of the children. Unwed mothers are the societal norm, and the law requires fathers to support their children. Men are important for their earning ability, but their domestic role is relatively peripheral. Older women can usually count on financial support from family members living at home or contributions from the earnings of grown children.

Violence against women 
Domestic violence against women was a continuing problem. Police rarely intervened in domestic disputes unless it involved a weapon or major assault. The authorities often dismissed the few cases that reached a prosecutor, or the court gave the perpetrator a light sentence. There was growing societal concern about domestic violence and increased recognition of the need to address it.

Rape, spousal rape, and domestic abuse are criminal offences punishable by a maximum of 20 years' imprisonment. During 2007, the Family Tribunal registered 74 domestic violence complaints. The police registered 56 rape cases and four cases of attempted sexual assault. The Social Affairs Division of the Ministry of Health and Social Development and Women in Action and Solidarity Organization, a local NGO, provided counseling services to rape victims.

Wider society 

There is no officially sanctioned gender discrimination in employment and women are well represented in business. As of 1994, women formed nearly half of the enrollment at the prestigious Seychelles Polytechnic, the highest level of education on the islands. As of 2007, there were 10 women in the 34-seat National Assembly, seven elected by direct election and three by proportional representation. Following the July 2007 cabinet reshuffle, there were two women in the cabinet.

Prostitution is illegal but remains prevalent. Police generally do not apprehend prostitutes unless their actions involved other crimes.

The law prohibits sexual harassment but is rarely enforced. Inheritance laws do not discriminate against women.

References

External links 

 
Seychelles